SABMiller was one of the top five global brewing companies, and had a range of over 150 beers, including international beers such as Pilsner Urquell, and Miller Genuine Draft, and local ones such as  Gambrinus and  Castle Milk Stout.

The company was acquired by Anheuser-Busch InBev in October 2016 and sold off its interest in MillerCoors to Molson Coors as required by regulators in the U.S. 
 The new company, Anheuser-Busch InBev SA/NV, is trading on the Brussels Stock Exchange as ABI.BR and as BUD on the New York stock exchange.

After the merger between Anheuser Busch Inbev and SABMiller, the new Anheuser-Busch InBev SA/NV company owns over 200 beer brands including Budweiser and Bud Light, Corona, Stella Artois, Beck's, Leffe,  Hoegaarden, Skol, Brahma, Antarctica, Quilmes, Victoria, Modelo Especial, Michelob Ultra, Harbin, Sedrin, Klinskoye, Sibirskaya Korona, Chernigivske, Cass and Jupiler. Anheuser-Busch InBev SA/NV also owns a soft drinks business that has bottling contracts with PepsiCo through its subsidiary, AmBev. In December 2016, Coca-Cola Co. bought many of the former SABMiller's Coca-Cola operations.

SAB Limited beers

Prior to the acquisition of SABMiller by Anheuser-Busch InBev, the company owned the following brands; they have since been sold or are made by a company that is now a subsidiary of Anheuser-Busch InBev SA/NV.

Brutal Fruit (Brand family)
Carling Black Label 
Castle Lager
Castle Lite
Castle Milk Stout
Castle Free (Non-alcoholic)
Hansa Marzen Gold (discontinued in 2015)
Hansa Pilsener 
Lion Lager
Lion Ale (discontinued in 1980's)
Miller Genuine Draft 
Peroni
Redd's Dry
Redd's Premium Cold
Sarita 
Sterling Light Lager (discontinued)

SABMiller India Ltd. breweries
Fosters
Haywards 2000
Haywards 5000
Indus Pride
Knock Out
Royal Challenge

Botswana brewery
Chibuku Shake Shake (so called because it separates out and must be shaken) is brewed  from a mix of sorghum and maize, and sold in paper cartons or 2 litre brown plastic containers with a wide blue lid.

Canarias Brewery

The Canarias Brewery was formed in 1994 from the merger of two Canary Island breweries, CCC and SICAL, both of whom had been established at the start of the 20th century. The brewery produces the beers Dorada and Tropical, and brews under licence various global beers such as Carlsberg, Pilsner Urquell and Guinness.

Castle brewery

Castle Brewery was founded in Johannesburg in 1894. It later merged with other breweries to form South African Breweries (SAB) which subsequently became SABMiller. Castle Brewery is still a division of SAB but is now owned by Anheuser-Busch InBev SA/NV.

Delta Corporation Zimbabwe

Eagle Lager
Castle Lager
Golden Pilsner
Bolingers Lager
Zambezi Lager
Lion Lager
Chibuku Opaque Beer
Chibuku Super

Dreher Brewery

This company (Dreher Sörgyárak) in Budapest was owned by SABMiller.
After acquiring SABMiller, Anheuser-Busch InBev SA/NV agreed on 21 December 2016 to sell Dreher to [Asahi Breweries] of Japan.

Cerveceria Hondureña (Honduran Brewery)

Barena
Port-Royal
Imperial
Salva-Vida

Intafact Beverages Limited

 Hero Lager
 Castle Milk Stout (6%ABV)
 Grand Malt (non-alcoholic)
 Beta Malt (non-alcoholic)

International Breweries plc

 Trophy Lager 
 Trophy Stout
 Betamalt
 Grand Malt

Kgalagadi Breweries Limited

 St Louis Lager
 St Louis Export
 Castle Lager
 Carling Black Label
 Lion Lager

Kompania Piwowarska breweries

Kompania Piwowarska (which in Polish means "Brewing Company") is a brewing company established in Poland in 1999 as a result of the merger of two SABMiller owned Polish breweries, the Lech brewery in Poznań, and the Tyskie Górny Śląsk brewery in Tychy, which was founded in 1629. The company also owns the Dojlidy Brewery in Białystok. The three breweries have a total capacity of 15.1 million hectolitres. 
SAB purchased a majority share in the Lech and Tyskie breweries in 1995. Kompania Piwowarska currently controls 45% of the Polish beer market.

After acquiring SABMiller, Anheuser-Busch InBev SA/NV agreed on 21 December 2016 to sell Kompania Piwowarska to Asahi Breweries of Japan.

La Constancia brewery, El Salvador

Pilsener
Golden Light
Regia
Suprema

Mozambique brewery (CDM) 

2M
2M Flow
Laurentina
Laurentina Clara
Laurentina Premium 
Laurentina Preta 
 
Manica  
Impala(cassava-based beer)  
Dourada 
 Raiz (discontinued)

Nile brewery

The original brewery is in Jinja, Uganda.
Chairman's Extra Strong Beer (ESB)  
 Club Pilsner
Nile Special Lager 
 Nile Gold

Plzeňský Prazdroj brewery

Pilsner Urquell 
Gambrinus 
Gambrinus Dia with lower sugar content 
Gambrinus Premium

Radegast Brewery

Radegast Brewery is a brewery located in Nošovice, Moravian-Silesian Region of the Czech Republic since 1970. The beer is named after the god Radegast. The brewery has been owned by Pilsner Urquell since 1999, which in turn was owned by SABMiller. On 21 December 2016, Anheuser-Busch InBev SA/NV agreed to sell Pilsner Urquell to Asahi Breweries Group Holdings, Ltd.

Tanzanian breweries

 Kilimanjaro Lager
Balimi 
 Castle Lite
 Ndovu Premium Lager
 Safari Lager

Colombian breweries (Bavaria)

Aguila 
Aguila Light 
Aguila Imperial (Yearly special production)
Brava (No longer produced)
Costeña
Costeñita
Club Colombia 
Pilsen
Poker
Poker Ligera

Peruvian breweries (Backus)

Arequipeña 
Cristal 
Pilsen Callao
Backus Ice
Pilsen Trujillo
Cusqueña Dorada
Cusqueña Trigo
Cusqueña Red Lager
Cusqueña Malta
Cusqueña Quinua 
San Juan

Ecuadorian breweries (Cerveceria Nacional)

Pilsener 
Pilsener Light
Club Premium
Conquer
Dorada
Pony Malta
Agua Manantial con gas y sin gas

Ursus Breweries

Ursus Breweries was a subsidiary of SABMiller plc, is one of the top brewers in Romania.

After acquiring SABMiller, Anheuser-Busch InBev SA/NV agreed on 21 December 2016 to sell Ursus to [Asahi Breweries] of Japan.

Southern Sudan Beverages Limited

Southern Sudan Beverages Limited runs White Bull, a lager.

Eswatini Beverages Ltd

Eswatini Beverages Ltd brews Sibebe Lager.

Other breweries

Atlas
Balboa 
Blue Sword
Ciucaş 
Club Shandy 
Del Altiplano 
Dog In The Fog 
Gran Riserva 
Green Leaves 
Golden Light 
Golden Pilsener
Huadan Dry Beer 
Huadan Yale
Indus Pride
Knock Out 
Kobányai Sör 
Largo 
Legenda 
Lowen
Malta Arequipeña 
Malta Cusqueña 
Malta Polar 
Maluti Premium Lager (Lesotho)  
Mosi Lager (Zambia)
Moya Kaluga 
N'gola (Angola)
New Three Star
Port Royal 
Raffo 
Redd's Apple 
Redd's Green Apple 
Redd's Strawberry
Redd's Sun 
Regia Extra 
Rhino Lager 
Royal Challenge Premium Lager 
Salva Vida  
San Juan 
Saris Light 
Saris Dark 
Saris Premium 
Shengquan 
Shenyang 
Singo 
Sip 
Smadny mnich Light 
Snow beer 11°P 
Stejar  
Stone Strong Lager 
Suprema 
Tianjin 
Timişoreana 
Topvar 
Tri Bogatyrya Bochkovoye 
Tri Bogatyrya Svetloye 
Tropical Pils 
Tropical Premium 
Velkopopovický Kozel 
Velkopopovický Kozel Cerny 
Velkopopovický Kozel Premium 
Velkopopovický Kozel Svetly 
Vitamalt
Whisky Black 
Wührer
X-Cape
Yingshi
Zero 
Zolotaya Bochka Klassicheskoye (Golden Barrel Classic) 
Zolotaya Bochka Svetloye (Golden Barrel Light) 
Zolotaya Bochka Vyderzhannoye (Golden Barrel Aged)

Miller Brewing Company beers

All of the Miller brands and subsidiaries were sold to Molson Coors on October 11, 2016 as required by regulators before the forming of the new company, Anheuser-Busch InBev SA/NV. All of those brands are now made by Miller Brewing Company, a subsidiary of MillerCoors.

Non-beer brands
SABMiller was one of the world's largest Coca-Cola bottlers and had carbonated soft drinks bottling operations in 14 markets.  In December 2016, Coca-Cola Co. bought many of the Anheuser-Busch InBev SA/NV company's Coca-Cola operations. The affected regions include Zambia, Zimbabwe, Botswana, Swaziland, Lesotho, El Salvador and Honduras. The deal requires regulatory approval and should close by the end of 2017.

Brands produced have included:

Appletiser
Bibo
Bon Aqua
Coca-Cola
Cristal water
Fanta
Grapetiser
Guaraná Backus
Just Juice
Malta Leona
Malta Leona Cool 
Milo (owned by Nestle)
Minute Maid
Nestea (owned by Nestle)
Nevada
Play
Pony Malta
Valpré
Saboré
Sparkling Grenadilla
Sparletta
Sprite
TAB
Tropical
Tutti Frutti
Viva

References

SABMiller